The men's 5000 metres at the 1958 European Athletics Championships was held in Stockholm, Sweden, at Stockholms Olympiastadion on 21 and 23 August 1958.

Medalists

Results

Final
23 August

Heats
21 August

Heat 1

Heat 2

Participation
According to an unofficial count, 25 athletes from 16 countries participated in the event.

 (2)
 (1)
 (1)
 (1)
 (2)
 (2)
 (1)
 (2)
 (1)
 (2)
 (2)
 (2)
 (2)
 (1)
 (2)
 (1)

References

5000 metres
5000 metres at the European Athletics Championships